Amparo "Weena" Lim (born 9 September 1969) is a Filipino badminton player who competed in the women's singles at the 1996 Summer Olympics.

Early life
Amparo Lim was born on 9 September 1969, one of five children to Jose "Dondo" V. Lim III and Remedios "Baby" P. Gana. Her elder brother Joey Lim was a basketball tournament organizer. She was coached by Nelson Asuncion.

Career
Lim was the first Philippine badminton player to compete at the Olympics. She participated in the women's singles category at the 1996 Summer Olympics but lost to Poland's Kataryna Krasowska in the first round by 6-11, 5-11. She teamed with Kennie Asuncion to win the women's doubles title at the 1996 Australian Open and secured a bronze in women's singles. 

At the next year's Southeast Asian Games, the pair won a bronze medal in women's doubles and became the first Philippine pair to reach the quarter-finals of Vietnam Open. They also have won a bronze at the 2002 U.S. Open's women's double event. 

Lim was appointed the Philippine Sports Commissioner in 2000 following the resignation of Tisha Abundo and served in that capacity until March 2002.

Achievements

Southeast Asian Games 
Women's doubles

IBF International 
Women's doubles

References

1969 births
Living people
Filipino female badminton players
Badminton players at the 1996 Summer Olympics
Olympic badminton players of the Philippines
Southeast Asian Games medalists in badminton
Southeast Asian Games bronze medalists for the Philippines
Competitors at the 1997 Southeast Asian Games
Badminton players at the 1998 Asian Games
Asian Games competitors for the Philippines